The 1956-57 Segunda Divisão is the 23rd season of Segunda Divisão.

Table

Segunda Divisão - Zona Norte

Segunda Divisão - Zona Sul

Playoffs

References

Portuguese Second Division seasons
2
Portugal